Supriyo Datta (born 1954) is an Indian born American researcher and author. A leading figure in the modeling and understanding of nano-scale electronic conduction, he has been called "one of the most original thinkers in the field of nanoscale electronics."

As an author, his books are widely used as original research and design work in the field of nanotechnology and electronic devices.

Early life and education
Dr. Datta did his schooling from Hindi High School in Kolkata, India. He was first in the whole West Bengal Board of Secondary Education exam in 1970. Datta received his B.Tech with the President of India gold medal from the Indian Institute of Technology in Kharagpur, India in 1975. He then received both his MS and PhD from the University of Illinois at Urbana-Champaign in 1977 and 1979 respectively.

In 1981, he joined Purdue University, where he is (since 1999) the Thomas Duncan Distinguished Professor in the School of Electrical Engineering.

Career
He started his career in the field of ultrasonics and was selected by the Ultrasonics group as its outstanding young engineer to receive an IEEE Centennial Key to the Future Award and by the ASEE to receive the Terman Award for his book on Surface Acoustic Wave Devices.

Since 1985 he has focused on nanoscale electronic devices and has contributed through his foundational work on (1) quantum transport, (2) spintronics and (3) negative capacitance electronics.

(1) Quantum transport: In a series of papers between 1985 and 1995 his group demonstrated how the non-equilibrium Green's function (NEGF) formalism used by many-body physicists for uniform conductors could be extended to model electronic devices which are non-uniform and have contacts. He made this work broadly accessible through his book Electronic Transport in Mesoscopic Physics, Cambridge (1995), which is now considered a classic with 10,000+ citations.

Between 1995 and 2005 his group combined his earlier NEGF approach with an atomistic Hamiltonian, to establish a conceptual and computational framework that is used by quantum chemists in molecular electronics, and is also the basis for modern quantum transport simulation tools routinely used in the semiconductor industry. He made this work broadly accessible through his book Quantum Transport: Atom to Transistor, Cambridge (2005).

Between 2005 and 2015 his group developed approaches for analyzing spin-based devices and circuits that incorporate them. This work along with a new perspective on transport is described in his book Lessons from Nanoelectronics, World Scientific (2015).

(2) Spintronics: In 1990 he proposed, the use of spin-orbit coupling to control electron spin with an electric field rather than a magnetic field. This was experimentally demonstrated in 1997  and is widely used in the field of spintronics. This "proposal planted the idea that spin could be used in its own right as a means to carry and manipulate information — and gave birth to the new field of spintronics.",

(3) Negative capacitance electronics: In 2008, along with Sayeef Salahuddin he proposed the concept of negative capacitance devices, which is now considered a prime candidate for reducing dissipation and extending Moore's law.

Awards
In 2012 he was elected as a member into the National Academy of Engineering (NAE) for quantum transport modeling in nanoscale electronic devices.

In 2011 he received the William Procter Prize for Scientific Achievement.

He is a Fellow of the American Physical Society (APS) as well as the Institute of Electrical and Electronics Engineers (IEEE) and has received two IEEE technical field awards: the 2002 IEEE Cledo Brunetti Award , and the 2008 IEEE Leon Kirchmayer Award.

He is included in Purdue's Book of Great Teachers  and won the "Herbert Newby McCoy Award"  and the "Morrill Award"  given by Purdue University.

He received the Frederick Emmons Terman Award from the American Society of Engineering Education in 1994, and the Presidential Young Investigator Award from the National Science Foundation, 1984.

Books 
Lessons from Nanoelectronics 
 Quantum Transport: Atom to Transistor 
Electronic Transport in Mesoscopic Systems: Cambridge Studies in Semiconductor Physics and Microelectronic Engineering 
Quantum Phenomena:Modular Series on Solid State Devices, Vol 8 
Surface Acoustic Wave Devices

Online Lectures 

  youtube A Different Perspective on NEGF
  nanoHUB A Different Perspective on NEGF

Online Courses 

 Purdue-X course Fundamentals of Current Flow
 Purdue-X course Introduction to Quantum Transport
 Purdue-X course Boltzmann Law: Physics to Computing
 nanoHUB-U course Fundamentals of Current Flow
 nanoHUB-U course Introduction to Quantum Transport
 nanoHUB-U course Boltzmann Law: Physics to Computing

References

External links
 Supriyo Datta at nanoHUB

Living people
Fellow Members of the IEEE
Purdue University faculty
Members of the United States National Academy of Engineering
1954 births
Indian American
Fellows of the American Physical Society